Kallem-Verri oil field is an Albanian oil field that was discovered in 1975. It is one of the biggest on-shore oil field of Albania. It is situated near the villages Kallmi and Verri, both in the Mbrostar municipal unit. It began production in 1976 and produces oil.

See also

Oil fields of Albania

References

Oil fields of Albania